Langlade County Airport  is a county-owned public-use airport located two nautical miles (4 km) northeast of the central business district of Antigo, a city in Langlade County, Wisconsin, United States. It is included in the Federal Aviation Administration (FAA) National Plan of Integrated Airport Systems for 2021–2025, in which it is categorized as a basic general aviation facility.

Although most U.S. airports use the same three-letter location identifier for the FAA and IATA, this airport is assigned AIG by the FAA but has no designation from the IATA (which assigned AIG to Yalinga in the Central African Republic).

History
The facility was used by the United States Army Air Forces as a contract glider training airfield, known as Antigo Airport. Anderson Air Activities provided preliminary glider training. The school was one of 18 private operator contract schools that ran for 90 days beginning approximately July 6, 1942. There were but a few two place soaring gliders available for training. The Army delivered a few single engine, L type aircraft to be used. The primary training in these aircraft involved so called "dead-stick" landings. The student then landed the plane as a glider.

By September 1942, the Southeast Air Forces Training Command had been instructed to shut down the school as the shortage of gliders and single engine aircraft did not allow the school to train and produce the number of students required by the USAAF. Antigo Airport was closed, the Army flew the planes out and the land was returned to the local farmers.

Facilities and aircraft
It has two asphalt paved runways: 17/35 is 4,010 by 75 feet (1,220 x 23 m); 9/27 is 3,400 by 75 feet (1,036 x 23 m). Both runways have approved GPS approaches. The Antigo NDB navaid, (AIG) frequency 347 kHz, is located on the field.

For the 12-month period ending August 20, 2020, the airport had 8,250 aircraft operations, an average of 23 per day: roughly 97% general aviation, 2% air taxi and 1% military. In February 2023, there were 15 aircraft based at this airport: all 15 single-engine.

Walker Aviation LLC is the fixed-base operator.

In March 2008, the Governor of Wisconsin approved plans to construct a new T-hangar for nearly $400,000 with the Federal Aviation Administration providing the bulk of the funding.

Incidents
 Two people were killed on December 9, 1993, when their Piper PA-32R-300 crashed while attempting to land during IFR weather conditions.

See also

 List of airports in Wisconsin
 Wisconsin World War II Army Airfields
 29th Flying Training Wing (World War II)

References

 Manning, Thomas A. (2005), History of Air Education and Training Command, 1942–2002.  Office of History and Research, Headquarters, AETC, Randolph AFB, Texas 
 Shaw, Frederick J. (2004), Locating Air Force Base Sites, History’s Legacy, Air Force History and Museums Program, United States Air Force, Washington DC.

External links
 Langlade County Airport website
 Langlade County Airport at the Wisconsin Department of Transportation
 The WW II Glider Pilots
 

1944 establishments in Wisconsin
USAAF Contract Flying School Airfields
USAAF Glider Training Airfields
Airfields of the United States Army Air Forces in Wisconsin
Airports in Wisconsin
Buildings and structures in Langlade County, Wisconsin